Richard Stanford (March 2, 1767 – April 9, 1816) was a Democratic-Republican U.S. Congressman from North Carolina between 1797 and 1816.

Biography
Born near Vienna, Maryland in 1767, Stanford moved to Hawfields, North Carolina, around 1793 and established an academy. He was elected to Congress as a Democratic-Republican in 1796 and was re-elected nine times before his death in Georgetown in 1816. During the 13th Congress, Stanford chaired the Committee on Revisal and Unfinished Business. He is buried in the Congressional Cemetery.

Stanford was the grandfather of Tennessee Senator William Robert Webb.

See also
List of United States Congress members who died in office (1790–1899)

References
 Retrieved on 2009-5-15

1767 births
1816 deaths
Burials at the Congressional Cemetery
People from Dorchester County, Maryland
Democratic-Republican Party members of the United States House of Representatives from North Carolina
People from Alamance County, North Carolina
18th-century American politicians
19th-century American politicians
Deans of the United States House of Representatives